Connor David Norby (born June 8, 2000) is an American professional baseball second baseman in the Baltimore Orioles organization. He played college baseball for the East Carolina Pirates.

Early life and amateur career
Norby was born and lived in Brooklyn Park, Minnesota until he moved to Kernersville, North Carolina before starting high school at East Forsyth High School.

Norby played in 26 games with two starts in his freshman season at East Carolina and batted .194. As a sophomore, he batted .403 with 25 hits and 14 runs scored in 17 games before the season was cut short due to the coronavirus pandemic. The following season, he batted .415 with 15 home runs, 15 doubles, 51 RBIs and 18 stolen bases and was named the American Athletic Conference Player of the Year. He led NCAA Division I with 102 total hits and was named a first team All-American by the American Baseball Coaches Association and Baseball America and won the Bobby Bragan Collegiate Slugger Award.

Professional career
Norby was selected in the second round with the 41st overall pick in the 2021 Major League Baseball draft by the Baltimore Orioles. He signed with the team on July 16, 2021, and received a $1.7 million bonus.

Norby was assigned to the Rookie-level Florida Complex League Orioles to start his professional career. He was later promoted to the Delmarva Shorebirds of the Low-A East. Over 33 games between the two teams, he slashed .264/.380/.405 with three home runs, 19 RBIs, and six stolen bases. On April 5, 2022, Norby was assigned to the Orioles High-A affiliate Aberdeen Ironbirds, along with fellow 2021 Draftee Colton Cowser.

References

External links

East Carolina Pirates bio

Living people
Baseball second basemen
East Carolina Pirates baseball players
Baseball players from North Carolina
2000 births
Florida Complex League Orioles players
Delmarva Shorebirds players
Aberdeen IronBirds players
Bowie Baysox players